Acacia camptocarpa is a shrub belonging to the genus Acacia and the subgenus Juliflorae. It is native to a few small areas of the Kimberley region of Western Australia.

See also
 List of Acacia species

References

camptocarpa
Acacias of Western Australia
Taxa named by Russell Lindsay Barrett
Taxa named by Bruce Maslin
Taxa named by Matthew David Barrett